Mar Jose Kalluvelil (born November 15, 1955) is an Indian prelate of the Catholic Church; he was serving as the first bishop of the Syro-Malabar Catholic Eparchy of Mississauga.

Jose Kalluvelil was born on November 15, 1955 at Thottuva, Kuravilangad, in the Eparchy of Pala, India as the youngest son of Joseph and Annamma. He has four brothers. At the age of four, the family moved to Jellipara, in the Eparchy of Palghat, India. After completing High School studies, he joined St. Mary’s Minor Seminary, Thrissur. Major Seminary formation was at St. Thomas Apostolic Seminary, Kottayam, India where he received his Bachelor’s Degree in Philosophy and Theology. He was ordained priest on December 18, 1984 by His Excellency Mar Joseph Irimpen, the first Bishop of Palghat.

Fr. Jose began his priestly ministry on January 15, 1985 at Fathima Matha Church as Asst. Parish Priest and Director of St. Joseph’s Boys Home at Agali. In 1989 he was appointed Director of Catechetical Department in the Eparchy of Palghat where he served for 12 consecutive years. During this period he was also the Parish Priest at 3 other parishes: Panthalampadam, Olavakod and Ottapalam. In addition, he served the Eparchy as Diocesan Consultor, Founder Director of Kerala Catholic Students League, Director of Holy Childhood and Bible Apostolate. In 2001, Fr. Jose was sent to Rome for higher studies. He completed his licentiate in “Theology of Human Mobility” from Pontifical Urban University and Doctorate in “Family Catechesis” from Pontifical Salesian University, Rome. Back from Rome he served as Parish Priest of St. Antony’s Church Kottayi, and Fathima Matha Church Kallekad for one year. In 2007 Fr. Jose Kalluvelil was appointed Vicar of St. Raphael’s Cathedral Palghat, Manager of St. Raphael’s Higher Secondary School and Diocesan Consultor. After five years, in 2012, he was transferred to St. Thomas Forane Church Kanjirapuzha where he worked for one year. In 2013 he was sent to Canada for the pastoral care of St. Thomas Syro-Malabar Community, Toronto.

On August 06, 2015 Fr. Jose Kalluvelil was appointed Exarch of the newly erected Apostolic Exarchate for the Syro-Malabar Catholics in Canada and Titular Bishop of Tabalta by his Holiness Pope Francis. He was ordained Bishop on September 19, 2015. After 3 years, on December 22nd 2018 the exarchate has been elevated into the status of an Eparchy. The inauguration of the Eparchy and the installation of Bishop Jose Kalluvellil were solemnized on May 25th 2019 by His Beatitude Mar George Cardinal Alencherry, the Major Archbishop of the Syro-Malabar Church.

References

1955 births
Living people